Events in the year 1860 in Belgium.

Incumbents 
Monarchy of Belgium: Leopold I
Head of government: Charles Rogier

Events 

 28 May – Provincial elections
 9 July – Belgian consulate in Damascus destroyed during anti-Christian pogroms.
 18 July – Duties charged on goods brought from the countryside into towns abolished.
 7 October – One of the monks sets fire to the church and one of the dormitories at Scourmont Priory.
 16 November – Execution of Jan Coucke and Pieter Goethals.

Publications 
Periodicals
 Annales de pomologie belge et étrangère, vol. 8.
 Annuaire de l'Académie Royale des Sciences, des Lettres et des Beaux-Arts de Belgique, 26.
 Annuaire militaire officiel, 14.
 La Belgique Horticole, 10.
 La Belgique
 Bulletin du bibliophile belge, 16
 Collection de précis historiques, 9, edited by Edouard Terwecoren

Monographs and reports
 La Belgique en 1860 (Brussels, Philippe Hen).
 Manifestation nationale du peuple belge en 1860 (Brussels, E. Guyot, and Haarlem, J. J. Weeveringh).
 Recueil des pièces imprimées par ordre de la Chambre des Représentants, vol. 1.
 Louis Hymans, Histoire populaire de la Belgique (Brussels and Leipzig, Auguste Schnée)
 F. Prové, De la question monétaire en Belgique (Brussels, J.-B. Tarride).

Guidebooks
 A Handbook for Travellers on the Continent: Being a Guide to Holland, Belgium, Prussia, Northern Germany, and the Rhine from Holland to Switzerland (London, John Murray).

Literature
 Joseph Octave Delepierre, A Sketch of the History of Flemish Literature and its Celebrated Authors from the Twelfth Century to the Present Time (London, John Murray).
 Jules de Saint-Genois, Profils et portraits

Births 
 12 January – Charles Lemonnier, politician (died 1930)
 24 February – Max Waller, writer (died 1889)
 11 March – Rodolphe Wytsman, painter (died 1927)
 2 April – Paul Costermans, colonial administrator (died 1905)
 13 April – James Ensor, painter (died 1949) 
 2 May – Heva Coomans, painter (died 1939)
 23 June – Albert Giraud, poet (died 1929)
 28 June – Aloïs Biebuyck, officer (died 1944)
 12 August – Ernest Baert, explorer (died 1894)
 26 August – Luis Siret, archaeologist (died 1934)
 4 December – Charles de Broqueville, politician (died 1940)
 15 December – Alphonse Michaux, engraver (died 1928)
 30 December – Leon Mazy, muralist (died 1938)

Deaths 
 1 April – Joseph Guislain (born 1797), physician
 20 April – Charles de Brouckère (born 1796), politician
 27 April – John E. Blox (born 1810), Jesuit
 11 September – Jean-Baptiste Masui (born 1798), civil engineer
 27 September – Charles-Joseph, 4th Duke d'Ursel (born 1777), politician
 10 October – Jules Victor Génisson (born 1805), painter
 13 October – Egide Linnig (born 1821), artist
 22 October – Pieter Vanderghinste (born 1789), composer

References 

 
Belgium
Years of the 19th century in Belgium
1860s in Belgium
Belgium